Gymnoscelis celaenephes is a moth in the family Geometridae. It is found in Australia (Queensland).

References

Moths described in 1907
Gymnoscelis